Bill Williams (born, March 22, 1934) is an American television journalist, currently working for WBIR-TV as Anchor Emeritus and special reporter. He has worked for WBIR since 1977.

Career
Williams began working for WBIR in 1977. He retired from WBIR in December 2000. He returned to the anchor desk for much of 2006 when his replacement left the station, and re-retired at the end of 2006. He is now anchor emeritus, he occasionally does some reporting, He currently Co-hosts Friends Across the Mountains Telethon and the Children's Miracle Network telethon on WBIR. Williams also works with Mission of Hope a outreach program for aid to the people in rural Appalachia. Williams returned the anchor desk again in February 2013 to anchor a "Retro Newscast" on WBIR with former WBIR anchor Edye Ellis, former WBIR sports director Bob Kesling and now former WBIR anchor Moira Kaye who was a weekend weather forecaster and morning anchor in the 1980s and early 1990s for WBIR  to celebrate 30 years of their slogan Straight from the Heart (of East Tennessee).

Other work
Williams has worked with Mission of Hope since its founding in 1996, Mission of Hope is an outreach program, to help the people and children of rural Appalachia. He has also done a lot of charitable work.

Honors and awards
Williams is a past recipient of the "Silver Circle Award" of the National Academy of Television Arts and Sciences. Carson-Newman College (now Carson-Newman University) awarded him an honorary Doctor of Divinity degree. In December 2010 the City of Knoxville changed the name of Hutchinson Avenue, the location of WBIR's studios, to "Bill Williams Avenue" in his honor.

80th Birthday
On Thursday March 20, 2014, WBIR-TV staff and anchors, Beth Haynes, Stoney Sharp, Robin Wilhoit and John Becker surprised Bill with a special gift and cake (Two days early, his birthday is March 22, 1934). Local celebrities, politicians and former co-workers including Knoxville mayor Madeline Rogero, radio host Phil Williams, former WBIR general manager Jim Hart, former WBIR co-anchor Margie Ison, Emmett Thompson from Mission of Hope, Suzanne Lindsey from Buddy's Bar-B-Q Restaurants and Catering, Knox County mayor Tim Burchett and current WBIR anchor Russell Biven who was on vacation, wished him a Happy 80th Birthday.

Personal life
Williams is a widower. He was married to his wife Wanda for 31 years. Williams continues to reside in East Tennessee.

References

Living people
People from Knoxville, Tennessee
1934 births
American television news anchors
American male journalists